For the Rowing competition at the 1990 Asian Games in Jianhaihu Aquatic Centre, Beijing, China, men's and women's singles, doubles, and fours competed from September 23 to September 26.

Medalists

Men

Women

Medal table

References 
 New Straits Times, September 27, 1990

External links 
 Olympic Council of Asia

 
1990 Asian Games events
1990
Asian Games
1990 Asian Games